Shankarrao Bajirao Bobdey (1915-2007) was an Indian politician. He was a Member of Parliament  representing Maharashtra in the Rajya Sabha the upper house of India's Parliament as member of the Indian National Congress.

References

Rajya Sabha members from Maharashtra
Indian National Congress politicians
1915 births
2007 deaths